Gunnar Alvar Galin (4 April 1902 – 21 January 1997) was a Swedish footballer, ice hockey player and bandy player. He was president of the International Bandy Federation from its foundation in 1955 to 1963.

Football career
Galin made 13 Allsvenskan appearances (five goals) for Djurgården and seven Allsvenskan appearances (one goal) for AIK. He played as an inside left.

References

1902 births
1997 deaths
Association football forwards
Swedish footballers
Swedish ice hockey players
Swedish bandy players
Federation of International Bandy presidents
Djurgårdens IF Fotboll players
AIK Fotboll players
IK Göta Ishockey players
IK Göta Bandy players
Allsvenskan players
AIK Fotboll directors and chairmen